The Plaza Patria railway station is part of the Guadalajara light rail system in the Mexican state of Jalisco, in the limits of Guadalajara and Zapopan.

References

External links

 

Guadalajara light rail system Line 3 stations
Railway stations in Guadalajara
Railway stations opened in 2020